Havlík (feminine Havlíková) is a Czech surname. Notable people with the surname include:

 Adam Havlík (born 1991), Czech ice hockey player
 Ferdinand Havlík (1928–2013), Czech clarinetist with Jiří Šlitr during the “golden era” of the Semafor Theatre, Prague
 Herbert Havlik (born 1946), Austrian Olympic sprint canoer 
 Štefan Havlík (born 1975), Slovak bodybuilder and soldier
 Vladimír Havlík (born 1959), Czech action artist
 Vlastimil Havlík (born 1957), Czech basketball player

See also
 Havlík's law, a linguistic paradigm dealing with the reduced vowels (known as jers or yers) in Proto-Slavic
 Havik, a cleric in the Mortal Kombat universe

Czech-language surnames